Vasudha Narayanan is an American scholar of Hinduism at University of Florida and former President of the American Academy of Religion.

Biography 
Vasudha Narayan has degrees from the University of Madras, University of Bombay, and Harvard University. From 1996 to 1998 she was the president of the society for Hindu-Christen studies. Vasudha Narayan was named Florida's Teacher of the Year in 2010. With the University of Florida, Vasudha Narayan made the nation's first Center for the Study of Hindu Traditions named CHiTra for research and study.

Books 
The Life of Hinduism (2007)

Hinduism (2004,2009)

The Vernacular Veda: Revelation, Recitation, and Ritual (1994)

The Tamil Veda: Phillan's Interpretation of the Tiruvaymoli (1989)

The Way and the Goal: Expressions of Devotion in the Early Srivaisnava Tradition (1987)

References

Living people
University of Florida faculty
Year of birth missing (living people)